Dero is a genus of annelids belonging to the family Naididae.

The genus has cosmopolitan distribution.

Species:

Dero abranchiata 
Dero asiatica 
Dero bimagnasetus

References

Annelids